The following is a list of the IRMA's number-one singles of 1995.

Dates given are the Saturday of publication.

See also
1995 in music
List of artists who reached number one in Ireland

1995 in Irish music
1995 record charts
1995